MERA 300 was a Polish-built 8-bit minicomputer family. It was first introduced in 1974 at the Poznań Trade Fair and Exhibition.

History
The MOMIK 8-B (MERA) minicomputer had been designed in Poland in 1973. In 1974 the MERA 300 (MERA ZSM), based on the previous model, was introduced. The same year, at the Poznań International Trade Fair and Exhibition, twelve more models were displayed. MERA 300 was designed by dr. Waldemar Romaniuk and Janusz Popko.

About the family
Family of the MERA 300 systems included:
       Data processing systems: MERA 300, 301, 302, 303, 304, 305, 306
       Interactive systems: MERA 342, MERA 344
       Control systems: MERA 362
       Universal and special-purpose systems: MERA 392, MERA 396

System architecture
MERA 300 included the next units:
       Processors: MOMIK 8b/100 (250 000 instructions/second)

MERA 300 series architecture
Sets of MERA 300 (MERA 302, MERA 303) included:
       Central unit with arithmetical unit
       Internal memory of 8000 8-bit words memory is divided into 32-word pages. Instruction memory could be accessed using an instruction pointer. Data could be addressed using page:word offset.
       Single-level interrupt system (32 interrupts),
       Channel multiplexer
       External peripherals:
       printer
       typewriter
       reader
       control console

The MERA 301 used magnetic tapes (PK-1 and PK-2) for data storage with a capacity of 0,5 million characters.

The MERA 305 was an extended version with DMA and a four-level interrupt system, with a total of 128 interrupts (4x32).

 Hard disk (licensed CDC 9425 cartridge disk drive), fixed plate and  exchangeable cartridge 2.5 megabits (3.125 megabytes)  each ,connected via DMA channel
 16-bit control interface used to connect e.g. CAMAC crate controllers 

The MERA 306 was a more complex, extended version with features including:
       Internal memory divided to 4k-word pages, with a maximum of approximately 8, 15, 24 or 32K words of memory
       Power-outage protection
       Real-time clock (RTC) interface
       Hard disk (MERA 9425)

In addition to the above, it was possible to attach other devices:
       Monitor and keyboard
       Specialized keyboard
       Tape memory
       Measuring devices and industrial automation.
The computer's machine language consisted of 34 instructions, including arithmetical, logical and control instructions.

Data Input/Output
Data input devices for the  MERA 300 series were:
       Tape reader and (CTK 50R) card reader with control unit (JS-CTK 50)
       CT 1001A tape reader with control unit (JS-CT 1001)
       CT 2000 tape reader with control unit (JS-CT 2000)

Data output devices:
       DT 105 tape puncher with control unit JS-DT 105
       DTK 50 tape and card puncher with control unit JS-DTK 50

Other input/output peripherals:
       TELETYPE MODEL 390:
       Printing keyboard input
       Printing data while reading from tape reader
       Printing data while punching tapes
       FACIT 384 typewriter
DZM 180 dot printer
       ALFA 311/M monitor:
       Display onscreen information
       Displaying keyboard input while recording data on a tape

Usage
       office
       collecting data
       data processing
       engineering computations
       measurement controlling
       industrial process controlling

Software
       OS RTX Real Time eXecutive program
Basic system programs:

 Programmable manually from the control console
       DDT bootloader
       Standard utilities
       MOTIS editor
       Software-emulated instructions
       Programming languages:
       Machine code
       MOTIS assembler
       BASIC
       FORTRAN

It should be mentioned that the MERA 300 RTX was not necessary while the MOTIS assembler ran, as it was able to work without an operating system.

Members of the family
       MERA 300
       MERA 301
       MERA 302
       MERA 303
       MERA 304
       MERA 305
       MERA 306

Bibliography 

 Piotr Misiurewicz, Andrzej Rydzewski, Minikomputer Mera 300. Instrukcja dla użytkownika. Wydawnictwa Politechniki Warszawskiej, Warszawa 1979 r. - Instruction of Minikomputer Mera 300 in Polish

References

Minicomputers
8-bit computers
Science and technology in Poland